The 1868 North Carolina gubernatorial election was held on April 21, 1868. Republican nominee William Woods Holden defeated Democratic nominee Thomas Samuel Ashe with 55.49% of the vote.

General election

Candidates
Major party candidates
William Woods Holden, Republican
Thomas Samuel Ashe, Democratic 

Other candidates
Daniel R. Goodloe, Independent

Results

References

1868
North Carolina
Gubernatorial